No. 9 Squadron, named the Griffins, is a Pakistan Air Force fighter squadron assigned to the No. 38 Multi-Role Wing of the PAF Central Air Command. The squadron is stationed at PAF Base Mushaf, Sargodha. It was the PAF's first fighter squadron and has been commanded by seven Chiefs of Air Staff of the Pakistan Air Force. The squadron crest is a red griffin which symbolises strength, aggressiveness, and vigilance. Scrolls around the squadron crest display the battle honours Sargodha 65 and Karachi 71.The Griffins are considered as the PAF's most elite unit as well as its most senior.

History

Background
No. 9 Squadron was originally raised on 13 November 1943 at Risalpur. The squadron was formed at Lahore on 3 January 1944, equipped with the Hawker Hurricane IIC, by Squadron Leader A.W. Ridler of the Royal Air Force. During this time the squadron was commanded by then Squadron Leader Asghar Khan and deployed in Burma where it was extensively involved in World War II operations against the Japanese, later being awarded the sword of a Japanese general for its services. The squadron was also converted to the Spitfire VIII in 1945, still with then Squadron Leader M. Asghar Khan in command.

First fighter squadron of Pakistan
In July 1947, then Squadron Leader Asghar Khan was a member of the Air Force Reconstitution Committee and insisted the squadron be transferred to the Royal Pakistan Air Force (RPAF). The squadron was thus established at Peshawar as the RPAF's first fighter squadron, equipped with eight Hawker Tempest fighters and commanded by Squadron Leader M. Ibrahim Khan. The squadron converted to the Hawker Sea Fury in July 1950 and moved to Kohat in November 1956.  The unit is believed to have created the first aerobatics team in the sub-continent with the formation of the Red Dragons in 1957. In March 1961, the squadron converted to the F-104 Starfighter.

During the 1965 Indo-Pak War the squadron flew reconnaissance, air defence, and fighter escort sorties, during which three Indian Air Force aircraft were shot down. Flight Lieutenant Aftab downed a Dassault Mystere on 6 September which was attacking targets at Rahwali, Flight Lieutenant Amjad H. Khan downed another Mystere on 7 September, and Squadron Leader Jamal A. Khan shot down an English Electric Canberra during a night-time interception.

After the 1971 Indo-Pak War started, the squadron was deployed to PAF Base Masroor and flew air defence, reconnaissance, escort, and day/night strike missions. Three Indian aircraft, a Folland Gnat and Sukhoi Su-7 of the Indian Air Force and a Breguet Alizé of the Indian Navy, were shot down. Squadron Leader Amjad Khan ejected after being shot down during an attack on an Indian radar. Wing Commander Mervyn Middlecoat and Flight Lieutenant Samad Changezi were killed after being shot down during dogfights with more modern and maneuverable MiG-21 interceptors of the Indian Air Force.

After the F-104 was retired in the early 1970s, the squadron was re-formed in January 1973 at PAF Base Rafiqui, equipped with the newly acquired Dassault Mirage 5 with the role of Tactical Attack. This role was changed on 15 June 1977 to that of an Operational Conversion Unit (OCU) and was moved again to PAF Base Masroor on 31 August 1981. Fifteen conversion courses were completed during this time. In June 1984, the unit was again moved to PAF Base Sargodha (now known as PAF Base Mushaf), re-equipped with the F-16 Fighting Falcon and re-tasked as a Multi-Role squadron. After the Soviet invasion of Afghanistan in 1979 there were many border violations by Russian and Afghan aircraft, three of which were shot down by No. 9 Squadron pilots. Two Sukhoi Su-22 fighters were downed on 17 May 1986, by Squadron Leader Mohammed Yousaf near Parachinar and an Antonov An-26 was downed by Squadron Leader Sikander Hayat on 30 March 1987. The Thomson-CSF ATLIS II laser designator pod was installed on No. 9 Squadron's F-16s from 1987 onwards to allow them to deliver laser-guided bombs.

On 27 May 1998, No. 9 squadron was deployed at short notice to PAF Base Samungli to provide air defence for Pakistan's nuclear infrastructure.

Exercises

National
 1960
 'Flight Safety' Trophy
 1991
 Awards: Top Gun 1991
 Trophies: 'Best Combat Ready Squadron', 'Combat Flying Training', 'Inter-Squadron Maintenance Efficiency'
 1993
 Trophies: 'Inter-Squadron Maintenance Efficiency'
 1996 – five pilots and their aircraft were deployed to PAF Base Masroor on 7 October 1996 to take part in the Inter-Squadron Armament Competition (ISAC 1996).
 Awards: 'Sher Afgan' for first place in 'Inter-Squadron Armament Competition' (ISAC 1996).
 Trophies: 'Best Multi-Role Squadron', 'Inter-Squadron Maintenance Efficiency' and 'Best Formation' trophy after leading the Pakistan Day fly-past performance.
 1997
 Awards: Top Gun 1997
 Trophies: 'War Preparedness', 'Best Combat Ready Squadron'.
2019
Sher Afgan Trophy (Top Gun): Wing Commander Nauman Akram Shaheed (OC 9 Squadron)

International
 Mid Link 74 – A CENTO exercise that took place at PAF Base Masroor in 1974.
 Anatolian Eagle 06 – In June 2006 a PAF contingent of F-16s from No. 9 Squadron was deployed to Konya Airbase in Turkey to take part in the Anatolian Eagle 2006 exercise.
 Red Flag 2010-4 – In mid-2010 the PAF sent six F-16B fighters and 100 personnel of No. 9 Squadron to Nellis Air Force Base in the United States, a journey that took six days and four stops, to take part in the Red Flag 2010-4 and Green Flag 2010-9 exercises. During the 12 days of the exercise, 57 air interdiction missions were flown by the PAF fighters and 50 air-to-air refuelling hook-ups were made with USAF tankers, during which 50,303 kg of jet fuel was transferred.
 Green Flag 2010-9
 Falcon Talon 2022

Aircraft Flown

Gallery

See also
List of Pakistan Air Force squadrons

References

External links
 PAF's No. 9 Squadron Griffins

Pakistan Air Force squadrons